Alexis Canoz S.J., (8 September 1805 – 2 December 1888) was a Jesuit missionary in India and was the first bishop of Trichy. He was born on 8 September 1805 at Sellières, France. In 1846 the Madura Mission was made into a vicariate Apostolic with Msgr. Canoz as its first vicar Apostolic; He was ordained a bishop on 29 Jun 1847 by Archbishop Louis (de Sainte Thérèse) Martini, with Bishop Clément Bonnand and Bishop Marion-Brésillac acting as Principal Co-Consecrators. In 1886, on the establishment of the catholic hierarchy in India, the Madura Vicariate was made the Diocese of Trichy with Msgr. Canoz becoming its first bishop. He participated in the first Vatican council as a Church father.

References

1805 births
1888 deaths
19th-century French Jesuits
Roman Catholic missionaries in India
Participants in the First Vatican Council
French Roman Catholic missionaries
Jesuit missionaries
French expatriates in India